Zachary Phillip Wylde (born Jeffrey Phillip Wielandt; January 14, 1967) is an American musician. He is best known as the lead guitarist for Ozzy Osbourne and as the founder, lead guitarist, lead singer, songwriter and producer of the heavy metal band Black Label Society. His signature bulls-eye design appears on many of his guitars and is widely recognized. He was also the lead guitarist and vocalist of Pride & Glory, who released one self-titled album in 1994 before disbanding. As a solo artist, he released the albums Book of Shadows and Book of Shadows II. Wylde joined the reunited Pantera in 2022 as a touring guitarist.

Early life
Zachary Phillip Wylde was born Jeffrey Phillip Wielandt in Bayonne, New Jersey, on January 14, 1967.  He is of Irish descent. He started playing guitar at the age of eight, but did not become serious about it until his early teenage years. At the age of 14, he worked at Silverton Music in Silverton, New Jersey. He grew up in Jackson, New Jersey, where he attended Jackson Memorial High School, graduating in 1985. He has stated that he often played the guitar almost non-stop between coming home from school and leaving for school the next morning, then would be completely exhausted during school the next day.

Career

Wylde played locally with his first band Stone Henge, then later with local New Jersey band Zyris. Later, he auditioned for lead guitarist and co-writer for Ozzy Osbourne. Wylde was hired to replace Jake E. Lee, who replaced Brad Gillis, who had himself replaced the deceased Randy Rhoads. Rhoads remains Wylde's foremost guitar-playing and stagecraft influence.

Wylde gravitated toward a particular Les Paul guitar, which has become known as "The Grail"; his bullseye-painted 1981 Gibson Les Paul Custom. Wylde lost the guitar in 2000 after it fell from the back of a truck transporting equipment as he was travelling between gigs in Texas. Rewards were offered to anyone that had information about the guitar. Wylde and The Grail were reunited three years later when a fan bought it at a Dallas pawn shop and saw the initials "Z.W." carved into the humbucker pickups backs. He contacted Wylde's former webmaster Randy Canis to arrange its return to Wylde. Grateful, Wylde gave the fan his signature model in exchange.

In 1995, Wylde auditioned for Guns N' Roses. Wylde was replaced in Osbourne's band by Joe Holmes from 1995 until his return in 2001. In January 2006, Wylde was recognized at the Hollywood Rock Walk of Fame, featuring his handprints and signature, in recognition of his successful career as a musician and his contribution to the music industry. The event was open to the public and many rock celebrities were present, including Ozzy Osbourne.

For a time in the mid-2000s he contributed a monthly column entitled "Brew-tality" for Guitar World magazine, discussing his techniques and equipment, as well as transcribing riffs and solo sections. After auditions in 2004/05, Ozzy Osbourne announced Wylde as the official guitarist for his album Black Rain, which was released in 2007. On stage with Osbourne, Wylde has been credited for lending a high level of energy and passion to performances.

Black Label Society headlined the second stage at the 2006 Ozzfest, with Wylde playing double duty with Ozzy Osbourne on certain dates. He also joined Osbourne for the Ozzy and Friends Tour in replacement of the Black Sabbath tour scheduled for the summer of 2012, playing a range of European dates including Graspop Metal Meeting in Belgium.

Wylde played a guitar solo on Black Veil Brides' cover of Kiss' "Unholy", on the 2011 EP Rebels.

Since 2014, Wylde has led a Black Sabbath cover band called Zakk Sabbath, handling guitar and vocal duties, joined by Rob "Blasko" Nicholson on bass  and Joey Castillo (Danzig, Queens of the Stone Age) on drums, who replaced original drummer John Tempesta. JP Gaster (Clutch) occupied the drummer's seat in between, in September 2017. The band tours intermittently, and released a single, three-track vinyl-only live 12", in 2016.

Wylde, Steve Vai, Nuno Bettencourt, Yngwie Malmsteen, and Tosin Abasi were featured on the Generation Axe tour in 2016, 2017, and 2018.

Wylde joined Ozzy Osbourne's band for a select number of dates during Osbourne's 2017 summer tour, and then performed as part of the No More Tours II tour.

On July 14, 2022, it was announced that Wylde had joined the reunited Pantera as a fill-in for original guitarist, and his close friend, Dimebag Darrell.

Personal life
Wylde and his wife, Barbaranne, have four children. Ozzy Osbourne is a godfather to one of his children. Wylde is a Roman Catholic who has described himself as a "Soldier of Christ".

Wylde was a close friend of fellow guitarist "Dimebag" Darrell Abbott and dedicated the song "In This River" to Abbott after he was murdered on stage in 2004.

In August 2009, Wylde was hospitalized due to blood clots and was subsequently forced to cancel his tour with Mudvayne and Static-X. After his hospitalization, he stopped drinking alcohol.

As of 2011, Wylde has partnered with Blair's Sauces and Snacks to produce "Berserker" hot sauce and several variations. He also promotes Death Wish Coffee via his Instagram page, as they have used his name in marketing their line, "Odinforce Blend".

Equipment
Wylde is known for his use of Gibson Les Paul Custom model guitars, equipped with EMG -81 and -85 active pickups, with his signature black-and-white "bulls-eye" graphic on them, a design he used to differentiate himself visually from Randy Rhoads – who was also frequently identified by his cream-colored Les Paul Custom, the guitar Wylde has used since he was 12 years old. The "bulls-eye" paint job was originally supposed to look like the spiral from the Alfred Hitchcock movie Vertigo, but when it came back incorrect from the paint shop, he liked the result and decided to keep it. One of Wylde's favorite stage guitars is a GMW RR-V, a model that is famously known as the "Polka-dot V" Created originally by luthier Karl Sandoval of California, used by Randy Rhoads, often mistaken as a custom Flying V.

Wylde's signature Les Pauls include a red flame-maple bulls-eye model, a black and antique-white bulls-eye model, an orange "buzz-saw" model, the pattern on which was inspired by a design on a Zippo lighter, and a "camo" bulls-eye model with mother of pearl neck inlays and a green camouflage paint scheme. His original bulls-eye Les Paul was purchased from one of the owners of Metaltronix Amplification. Metaltronix was building a one-off live rig for Wylde that was designed around one of the owner's guitars, a creamy white Les Paul Custom with EMG pickups, which would later become known as "The Grail". Wylde has a custom Dean Splittail with a mud splatter bulls-eye graphic, as well as a signature Splittail shaped Gibson model called the "ZV". Another Dean in his collection is a Dime series Razorback with custom Bulls-eye graphics ordered for him specially by Dimebag Darrell shortly before his murder in 2004; since receiving the guitar, he has only ever used it on stage to play the song "In This River", Zakk's personal tribute to Dimebag.

In practice, Wylde uses Marshall MG Series practice combos ranging in wattage levels from 10-30W during tour/private use especially in hotels and buses. He has also been known to use Marshall Valvestate combo amplifiers. Wylde has an extensive relationship with Marshall Amplification due to his love for their amplifiers, both solid state and tube-driven. Live, Wylde exclusively uses Marshall JCM 800's with twin 4 X 12 Cabinets loaded with EVM12L 300W Black Label Speakers. His usual signal path consists of his guitar > (on stage pedal board) Dunlop Wylde Wah > Dunlop Wylde Rotovibe > MXR ZW Phase 90 > MXR Wylde Overdrive > MXR Carbon Copy Delay > (to a back stage pedal board) > MXR EVH Flanger > MXR Black Label Chorus > split signals, one to each distorted amp into the High Gain input.

A detailed gear diagram of Wylde's 1988 Ozzy Osbourne guitar rig is well-documented.

At the 2015 NAMM Show, Wylde announced his new company called Wylde Audio and provided a preview of his new line of custom guitars and amplifiers. Currently he now is seen playing Wylde Audio equipment almost exclusively.

Media appearances

Guest album appearances
Wylde has made guest appearances on various albums by other artists:
 He contributed a guitar solo on Britny Fox's track "Six Guns Loaded" from their 1991 release, Bite Down Hard.
 He guested on Blackfoot's 1994 album After the Reign playing the second solo on the title track. 
 He played "White Christmas" on the Merry Axemas 2 Christmas guitar album.
 He appears as guest vocalist and guitarist on the tracks "Soul Bleed" and "Reborn" on Damageplan's debut album, New Found Power.
 He played guitar solos on Dope's single "Addiction" from their newest album, No Regrets.
 He plays a solo on the songs "Nameless Faceless" and "Wanderlust" on Fozzy's 2005 release All That Remains.
 He has worked alongside Yngwie Malmsteen and others on five of Derek Sherinian's solo albums: Inertia, Black Utopia, Mythology, Blood of the Snake and Molecular Heinosity.
 Wylde was a judge for the eighth annual Independent Music Awards. His contributions helped assist independent artists' careers.
 In 2010, he played lead guitar on My Darkest Days' first single "Porn Star Dancing", along with guest singers Chad Kroeger and Ludacris.
 In 2011, he featured in Jamey Jasta of Hatebreed's new project, Jasta, in the song "The Fearless Must Endure".
 He plays the guitar solo on Black Veil Brides' cover of the Kiss song "Unholy" on their EP, Rebels.
 Wylde contributed a solo to "Monument / Monolith", a song by The Rippingtons on their album Built to Last, which was released in 2012.
 He contributes a guitar solo on the track Steep Climb on Eric Gales' 2014 album Good For Sumthin.

Guest live performances

 On August 1, 1993, at Great Woods Amphitheatre in Mansfield, Massachusetts, Wylde appeared on stage with the Allman Brothers on lead guitar since Dickey Betts was unable to make the show, and they needed a guitarist at the last minute. This show is documented on the bootleg Zakk Goes Wylde.
 Wylde performed the U.S. national anthem on the electric guitar during a New York Rangers game in October 2005. He has also played the anthem at Los Angeles Kings and Dodgers games. A video of a Kings performance is included as an extra feature on the DVD Boozed, Broozed & Broken-Boned.
 On February 1, 2007, Wylde and Nick Catanese began a tour of acoustic shows at the Hard Rock Cafe in various cities across North America. Although Catanese had to leave mid-tour due to unspecified personal reasons, Wylde continued to play shows alone. He performed several songs on both the acoustic guitar and keyboard. The tour was eventually canceled due to unspecified reasons.
 On April 13, 2011, he was the guitarist for James Durbin on American Idol, during Durbin's performance of "Heavy Metal" by Sammy Hagar.
 On April 20, 2011, he joined Michael Bearden and the Ese Vatos (house band for Lopez Tonight) to perform the Lenny Kravitz song "Are You Gonna Go My Way".
 On May 14, 2011, Wylde performed the U.S. national anthem at Rockfest in Kansas City, Missouri.
 Wylde appeared onstage December 8, 2011 in Indianapolis, Indiana, to play a cover of AC/DC's "Whole Lotta Rosie" with Guns N' Roses while Black Label Society opened for Guns N' Roses during a leg of the US tour. Wylde also did this on subsequent shows before Black Label Society finished their run on the tour.
 In late 2014, Wylde appeared as one of the performers on the "Experience Hendrix 2014" tour along with Billy Cox, Eric Johnson, Jonny Lang, Kenny Wayne Shepherd, Buddy Guy and others.  Wylde performed "Manic Depression", "Little Wing", and "Purple Haze", as well as playing with many of the other performers.

Acting appearances
In 2001, Wylde appeared as the lead guitarist for a band called Steel Dragon in the movie Rock Star, starring Mark Wahlberg and Jennifer Aniston.
 Wylde appeared as himself in the Adult Swim animated program Aqua Teen Hunger Force, in the episode "Spirit Journey Formation Anniversary" (season 2, episode 16, first broadcast on October 19, 2003).
 Wylde appeared in the Californication episode "Suicide Solution" in 2011, credited as "Guitar Guy".
 Wylde also appeared playing guitar alongside Lorne and other audience members in Angels season 4 episode "The Magic Bullet" in 2003.
 Wylde appeared in the 2010 film Bones as Jed, Bones' uncle.

Other media
Wylde appeared in the 2008 music video game Guitar Hero World Tour as a playable character. He becomes unlocked upon defeating him in a specially recorded guitar battle and completing the Black Label Society song "Stillborn".

Discographywith Ozzy Osbourne 1988: No Rest for the Wicked
 1990: Just Say Ozzy (live album)
 1991: No More Tears
 1993: Live & Loud (live album)
 1995: Ozzmosis
 2001: Down to Earth
 2002: Live at Budokan (live album)
 2007: Black Rain
 2022: Patient Number 9with Pride & Glory 1994: Pride & GlorySolo 1996: Book of Shadows
 2016: Book of Shadows IIwith Zakk Sabbath 2016: Live in Detroit (live EP)
 2020: Vertigowith Black Label Society'''
 1998: Sonic Brew 2000: Stronger than Death 2001: Alcohol Fueled Brewtality Live!! +5 2002: 1919 Eternal 2003: The Blessed Hellride 2004: Hangover Music Vol. VI 2005: Mafia 2006: Shot to Hell 2009: Skullage 2010: Order of the Black 2011: The Song Remains Not the Same 2013: Unblackened 2014: Catacombs of the Black Vatican 2018: Grimmest Hits 2019: Nuns and Roaches: Tasty Little Bastards (EP)
 2021: Doom Crew Inc.''

References

External links

 
 Black Label Society official website
 Zakk Wylde Video Workshop on bonedo.de (in German; videos in English)

1967 births
Living people
20th-century American guitarists
20th-century Roman Catholics
21st-century American guitarists
21st-century Roman Catholics
American heavy metal guitarists
American male guitarists
Black Label Society members
Catholics from New Jersey
Generation Axe members
Guitarists from New Jersey
Jackson Memorial High School alumni
Lead guitarists
Musicians from Bayonne, New Jersey
The Ozzy Osbourne Band members
People from Jackson Township, New Jersey
Pride and Glory (band) members